Michael Douglass (born May 1, 1976) is an American sports shooter. He competed in the men's 10 metre air pistol event at the 2000 Summer Olympics.

References

External links
 

1976 births
Living people
American male sport shooters
Olympic shooters of the United States
Shooters at the 2000 Summer Olympics
Sportspeople from Portsmouth, Virginia